Callistodermatium is a fungal genus in the family Tricholomataceae. It is a monotypic genus, and contains the single species Callistodermatium violascens. The holotype was found in Brazil, and described by mycologist Rolf Singer in 1981.

See also

 List of Tricholomataceae genera

References

Tricholomataceae
Monotypic Agaricales genera
Fungi of South America
Taxa named by Rolf Singer